The Estonian Working People's Union was a front organization of the Communist Party of Estonia  (de facto controlled by the Stalinist Soviet regime and the Communist Party of the Soviet Union) formed to contest in the rigged 1940 Estonian parliamentary election, as the sole officially allowed bloc. It consisted of 22 organizations, including the formally independent Estonian Communist Party, Estonian branch of Komsomol, the Central Union of Estonian Trade Unions, and cultural society "Idea". Its platform claimed to unite "democratic strata of the society" and demanded friendship and alliance between Estonia and the USSR, democratic liberties, raising salaries, combatting unemployment, social security, land for the landless, assistance for small farms, lowering the workers' burden of debt, re-organization of personal taxation, free education, ethnic equality, democratization of the military and wide development of the national culture. According to official results, 92.8% of voters voted for the bloc, with a voter turnout of 84%.  

Similar organizations were set up in the other two occupied Baltic States for the same purpose: Union of the Working People of Lithuania and Latvian Working People's Bloc.

July Council

The new "People's Parliament" of Estonia . Despite the fact that the platform of the bloc did not explicitly call for the unification of Estonia with the Soviet Union, only for their alliance, the "parliament", informally called "Juulivolikogu" ("July Council"), it its first session, on July 21, voted unanimously to convert the state to Estonian SSR, renamed itself to "the Provisional Supreme Soviet of the Estonian Soviet Socialist Republic",  and on July 22 declared accession to the Soviet Union and on June 23 sent a petition to the Soviet Supreme Soviet asking to join (which was granted on August 6, 1940).

See also
List of members of the Supreme Soviet of the Estonian Soviet Socialist Republic, 1940–1947
Soviet occupation of the Baltic states.

References

Estonian Soviet Encyclopedia, Tallinn, 1987, vol 2, p. 456.

Defunct political parties in Estonia
Parties of one-party systems
1940 in Estonia